Bernard Trevor Colman (27 August 1941 – 22 March 2022) was a former UK Independence Party politician.  He was a Member of the European Parliament (MEP) for South West England. He represented the 2nd seat in the constituency.

Biography
He was born in St Breward, Cornwall, and had a grammar school education at Sir James Smith's Grammar School, Camelford, and Tavistock Grammar School. Following his retirement from the police he worked as a script adviser (1994–1998) to the television detective series Wycliffe.

Colman served on the UKIP National Executive Committee between 2004 and 2005.

He presented a programme called European Union: Shock Waves for Life TV in 2004. Life TV's owners were fined £12,000 by regulators Ofcom because of a lack of impartiality and failure to present alternative viewpoints.

Colman was listed third on UKIP's list in the South West region in the European Parliament elections in 2004.  UKIP took 22.6% of the vote in the region and their top two candidates, Graham Booth and Roger Knapman were elected to the European Parliament.  On 1 October 2008, Graham Booth retired and was therefore replaced in the Parliament by Trevor Colman as the next candidate on the list.  For the 2009 election, Colman was the first candidate on the UKIP list.

He contested the 2005 general election for the constituency of Teignbridge and came fourth, with 6.4% of the vote.

In the European Parliament, Mr Colman sat on the Committee on International Trade and is a substitute for the Committee on Constitutional Affairs.

In March 2011, Colman left the Europe of Freedom and Democracy group which includes UKIP, allegedly due to an "unresolved dispute over financial and staffing issues." However Colman continued to represent UKIP as a Non-Inscrit.

Colman resigned at the 2014 European election.

He died, following a long illness, on 22 March 2022.

References

External links

Official website of UKIP
Profile at European Parliament website

1941 births
Living people
People from St Breward
UK Independence Party MEPs
MEPs for England 2004–2009
MEPs for England 2009–2014
Politicians from Cornwall